Whims of Chambers is a jazz album by the bassist Paul Chambers released on the Blue Note label circa January 1957. The album features performances by Chambers with trumpeter Donald Byrd, tenor saxophonist John Coltrane, guitarist Kenny Burrell, pianist Horace Silver and drummer ”Philly” Joe Jones.

The Allmusic review by Scott Yanow states: "This is a fine effort and would be worth picking up by straightahead jazz fans even if John Coltrane had not participated."

Track listing
All compositions by Paul Chambers except as indicated

 "Omicron" (Donald Byrd) – 7:21
 "Whims of Chambers" – 4:06
 "Nita" (John Coltrane) – 6:34
 "We Six" (Donald Byrd) – 7:42
 "Dear Ann" – 4:21
 "Tale of the Fingers" – 4:44
 "Just for the Love" (John Coltrane) – 3:43

Personnel
Paul Chambers - bass
Donald Byrd - trumpet
John Coltrane - tenor saxophone
Kenny Burrell - guitar
Horace Silver - piano
Philly Joe Jones - drums

Session/release information

 Produced by Alfred Lion
 Recording engineer: Rudy Van Gelder
 Cover photo by Francis Wolff
 Cover design by Reid Miles
 1996 reissue digitally remastered by Ron McMaster

References

Chambers, Paul. 1957. Whims Of Chambers. CD. Blue Note CDP 7243 8 37647 2 3.

1957 albums
Hard bop albums
Paul Chambers albums
Blue Note Records albums
Albums produced by Alfred Lion
Albums recorded at Van Gelder Studio